The United States Air Force's 9th Air Support Operations Squadron is a combat support unit located at Fort Hood, Texas. The squadron provides tactical command and control of airpower assets to the Joint Forces Air Component Commander and Joint Forces Land Component Commander for combat operations.

Lineage
 Constituted as the 9th Communications Squadron, Air Support, on 10 August 1942
 Activated on 21 August 1942
 Redesignated 9th Air Support Communication Squadron on 11 January 1943
 Redesignated 9th Air Support Control Squadron on 20 August 1943
 Redesignated 9th Tactical Air Communications Squadron on 1 April 1944
 Inactivated on 28 November 1945
 Disbanded on 8 October 1948
 Reconstituted and redesignated 9th Air Support Operations Squadron on 24 June 1994
 Activated on 1 July 1994

Assignments
 I Ground Air Support Command (later I Air Support Command,  I Tactical Air Division), 21 August 1942
 Fifth Air Force, November 1943
 V Fighter Command, 25 July 1945
 XIII Bomber Command, 20 October – 28 November 1945
 3d Air Support Operations Group, 1 July 1994 – present

Stations
 Mitchel Field, New York, 21 August 1942
 Morris Field, North Carolina, 7 November 1942
 Esler Field, Louisiana, 24 January 1943
 William Northern Field, Tennessee, c. 2 April 1943
 Lebanon Army Air Field, Tennessee, 8 April 1943
 Morris Field, North Caroina, 10 June – 22 October 1943
 Sydney, Australia, 21 November 1943
 Brisbane, Australia, 27 November 1943
 Nadzab, [Papua] New Guinea, 17 March 1944
 Clark Field, Luzon, Philippines, 1 April – 28 November 1945
 Fort Hood, Texas, 1 July 1994 – present

References

Notes
 Explanatory notes

 Citations

Bibliography

Military units and formations in Texas
Air support operations squadrons of the United States Air Force